Algorithmic curation is the curation (organizing and maintaining a collection) of online media using computer algorithms. Examples include search engine algorithms and social media algorithms. Examples include the Twitter feed algorithm, Facebook's algorithmic feeds and the Google search algorithm.

Curation algorithms are typically proprietary "black box" algorithms, leading to concern about invisible bias in their choices and the creation of filter bubbles.

References 

Mass media monitoring
Social influence